La Vega Central, also known as the Feria Mapocho (Mapocho market), is a market located at the far south of Recoleta commune in Santiago de Chile, almost at the north bank of the Mapocho River. A wide variety of products are sold in its surrounds, principally fresh fruit and vegetables from the Chilean Central Valley. La Vega Central is also home to over 500 dairy, meat, goods and merchandise stores, and offers a variety of Chilean cuisine. Today, hundreds of thousands of people pass daily through La Vega's 60,000 square meters of stalls. La Vega Central has now achieved iconic status in Chile's capital. A long-time vendor at the market was quoted as saying, “Markets nowadays compete (for customers) by using marketing, but La Vega has never had to resort to this. It subsists on its own creation and that is its magic.”

History 

From the colonial era, farmers gathered in La Chimba area to sell their products. In the 18th century, with the construction of the Puente de Calicanto, a large number of vendors and merchants began to set up on its surroundings. In the 19th Century, when the area was known as “La Vega del Mapocho” (the Mapocho market) the land was delimited and designated for produce consumption, taking advantage of the channelling of the Mapocho River. New storage houses were also built to load and sell produce. An initiative by Agustín Gómez García led to the construction of La Vega Central in 1895, with the installation of warehouses made of solid material inaugurated in 1916.

References

Economy of Chile
Retail markets in Chile